Azyakovo (Äjäk) is a rural locality (a village) and the administrative centre of Azyakovsky Selsoviet, Burayevsky District, Bashkortostan, Russia. The population was 267 as of 2010. There are 5 streets.

Geography 
Azyakovo is located 14 km southeast of Burayevo (the district's administrative centre) by road. Mullino is the nearest rural locality.

References 

Rural localities in Burayevsky District